Thiruninravur Lake or Thiruninravur aeri, is a lake spread over 330 hectares in Thiruninravur, Chennai, India. It is one of the largest lakes in the western part of the city.

In 2017, a proposal was sent to the government to restore the lake at a cost of  50 million.

See also

Water management in Chennai

References

Lakes of Chennai
Lakes of Tamil Nadu